Christine Estabrook (born Mary Christine Estabrook; September 13, 1952) is an American actress, known for her roles on the television series The Crew, Nikki, Desperate Housewives, and American Horror Story; she had a recurring role on the drama Mad Men during the show's fifth, sixth, and seventh seasons. Estabrook has received an Obie Award and Drama Desk Award.

Life and career
Estabrook was born to Julianne Shed in East Aurora, New York, and graduated from East Aurora High School. She has a brother, Bill.

At the O'Neill National Playwrights Conference, she created the role of the young daughter in Kevin O'Morrison's Ladyhouse Blues, which then moved to off-Broadway.  On Broadway, she was in The Inspector General and Andrei Șerban's production of The Cherry Orchard.  She won an Obie Award for her performance in Deborah Eisenberg's Pastorale at the Second Stage, off-Broadway.  She also created the role of Helen opposite William H. Macy in Durang's Baby with the Bathwater at Playwrights Horizons.  On Broadway, she took over the role of Feni in Wendy Wasserstein's The Sisters Rosensweig.  In the fall of 2006, she returned to Broadway in the musical Spring Awakening, playing all the adult female roles.

Since the 1990s, she has mostly done TV and movies, the latter including include Second Sight, Sea of Love, Presumed Innocent, and Spider-Man 2.

She had a recurring role on the popular ABC television series, Desperate Housewives playing Martha Huber, the widowed, nosy neighbor of the street and only friend of Edie Britt (Nicollette Sheridan). Her other appearances include a 2002 episode of the HBO original series, Six Feet Under, wherein she played Emily Previn, a woman who died alone without any family or friends. The episode sparked much discussion in the following days about the character's death. Estabrook has also guest-starred on 7th Heaven, Dharma and Greg, The Guardian, Veronica Mars, and NYPD Blue. In 2009, she guest-starred in two episodes of the CBS drama Ghost Whisperer as Evelyn James, Eli's mom.

In 2011, she appeared on the first season of FX series Murder House as Marcy. She later appeared in a recurring role in the AMC cable-television series Mad Men, playing Joan Harris' mother, Gail Holloway.

Filmography

Film

Television

Stage

References

External links
 
 
 

Place of birth missing (living people)
American film actresses
American stage actresses
American television actresses
Drama Desk Award winners
Obie Award recipients
Living people
Yale School of Drama alumni
American musical theatre actresses
20th-century American actresses
21st-century American actresses
Actresses from Pennsylvania
Actors from Erie, Pennsylvania
1952 births